Walter P Scott was a Scottish amateur football goalkeeper who made one appearance in the Scottish League for Queen's Park.

Personal life 
Scott served as a captain with the Argyll and Sutherland Highlanders during the First World War.

Career statistics

References

Year of birth missing
Scottish footballers
Scottish Football League players
British Army personnel of World War I
Association football goalkeepers
Queen's Park F.C. players
Date of death missing
Argyll and Sutherland Highlanders officers
Place of birth missing